Menidi may refer to the following places in Greece:

Menidi, Aetolia-Acarnania
Menidi, an alternative name for Acharnes, Attica